Lidya Tafesse Abebe (born 30 April 1980) is an international football referee from Ethiopia. She is an official at the 2019 FIFA Women's World Cup in France.

References

Living people
1980 births
Ethiopian football referees
FIFA Women's World Cup referees
Women association football referees